Lupin the 3rd Part II is a Japanese anime television series produced by TMS Entertainment. Part of the Lupin III franchise, it is the second anime television adaptation of the Lupin III manga series created by Monkey Punch. Among English-speaking fans, the series is commonly known as the "Red Jacket" series in reference to Lupin's outfit.

The series contains 155 episodes, which aired between October 3, 1977, and October 6, 1980, on the Japanese television network Nippon TV. Episodes 145 and 155 were the first to appear in the United States on VHS in 1994, released by Streamline Pictures separately under the title of Lupin III: Tales of the Wolf and together as Lupin III's Greatest Capers. In 2003, Pioneer Entertainment licensed and released 79 episodes in North America, some of which were broadcast on Adult Swim. The series was picked up by Discotek Media, who released all 155 episodes between 2017 and 2020.

Story
The series, based on the Lupin III manga written by Monkey Punch beginning in 1967, centers on the adventures of Lupin III, the grandson of Arsène Lupin, the gentleman thief of Maurice Leblanc's series of novels. He is joined by Daisuke Jigen, crack-shot and Lupin's closest ally; Fujiko Mine, the femme fatale and Lupin's love interest who works against Lupin more often than with him; and Goemon Ishikawa XIII, a master swordsman and the descendant of Ishikawa Goemon, the legendary Japanese bandit. Lupin is often chased by Inspector Koichi Zenigata, the rather cynical detective who has made it his life mission to catch Lupin.

Production
After Lupin the Third Part I  became popular during reruns, a new series was created. In contrast to the dark tone and violence of the more serious first series, this series made use of a lighter tone and more exaggerated animation to create a crime caper. Pop culture references appear frequently.

The music for the series was composed by Yuji Ohno.

Episodes 145 and 155 were written and directed by Hayao Miyazaki under the pseudonym "Terekomu" and they marked his final involvement with the Lupin franchise. Elements from these episodes would be reused in his films Nausicaä of the Valley of the Wind, Laputa: Castle in the Sky, and Porco Rosso.

Cast

Bob Bergen intended to reprise his role as Lupin in the Pioneer/Geneon dub, but chose not to because the dub was a non-union project.

Release

The series was broadcast on Nippon TV from October 3, 1977 to October 6, 1980. Episode 99 was the first anime episode to ever be broadcast in Stereo Sound.

The series was released on Blu-ray by VAP as individual discs as well as several boxsets. Six boxsets were released between February 25 and December 23, 2009. Twenty-Six individual discs were released between March 25, 2009 and January 27, 2010. Kodansha launched Lupin III DVD Collection, a bi-weekly magazine on January 27, 2015. Scheduled to run for 45 issues, the magazine includes a DVD containing episodes from the first two Lupin III TV series.

The first American release of the series was handled by Streamline Pictures, who distributed English language dubs of episodes 145 and 155 individually to VHS in 1994 as Lupin III: Tales of the Wolf and together as Lupin III's Greatest Capers in 1995.

The series was licensed by Pioneer Entertainment for North America. Due to some licensing issues regarding trademarked logos and musical elements, Pioneer were provided with altered masters by the licensor. An English dub was created by Phuuz Entertainment and given a "modern feel" alongside a subtitle script that is more faithful to the original dialog.  The storylines are unaffected by these changes. Due to potential controversy concerning an episode regarding Adolf Hitler, the episode that was originally broadcast third in Japan was delayed until later in the series. Fifteen volumes of the series containing a total of 79 episodes were released on DVD between January 28, 2003 to July 4, 2006. Episodes 1–27 were broadcast on Adult Swim from January 14, 2003. Richard Epcar, the director of the English dub and voice of Jigen revealed via Twitter that Geneon lost the license to the series before they could dub the rest of the episodes in English.

In 2009, the Southern California-based United Television Broadcasting network began airing subtitled episodes from the series on their UTBHollywood channel. The series is available to watch in dubbed and subtitled options on Hulu and Crunchyroll.

On December 20, 2015, longtime Lupin III distributor Discotek Media announced their acquisition of the North American distribution rights to the entire second series. Released in four sets, the releases included "any English dubs that already exist" and newly produced subtitles for episodes 80 to 155. The first set included the first 40 episodes and was released on January 10, 2017. The second set included episodes 41 through 79 and an interview with Richard Epcar and was released on December 26, 2017. Set three with episodes 80 through 117 was released on January 29, 2019. The fourth and final set was released on January 28, 2020, and included the Streamline English dub of episodes 145 and 155.

Reception
The final episode of the series received a viewing share of 32.5% in the Kantō region during its original broadcast on December 8, 1978. Due to this the series was ranked sixth on Video Research's list of anime series ranked by their highest rated episode in December 2015.

The series has attained a favourable response in the West. Rob Lineberger of DVD Verdict drew comparisons of the series to western works. He compared the flyovers of major cities and villains planning world domination to James Bond, the teamwork and "campiness" to Charlie's Angels and the "Zany humour" and disguises to Scooby-Doo but added that the series has "its own fun flavour". He expressed mixed views over the English dub and its attempt to modernise the series, understanding the negative reaction to it. However he personally enjoyed the dub. Chris Beveridge of Mania.com and Mike Crandol of ANN disliked the dub of the series because Pioneer Entertainment used many modern references and updated dialogue for a series that was released in the late 1970s, although the series itself received a positive overall review from both reviewers.

References

External links
 Official website 
 
 

1977 anime television series debuts
1980 Japanese television series endings
Discotek Media
Geneon USA
Part 2
Nippon TV original programming
TMS Entertainment
Topcraft